Benton is a city in and the county seat of Saline County, Arkansas, United States and a suburb of Little Rock. It was established in 1837. At the 2010 census, the city had a population of 30,681. In 2019 the population was estimated at 36,820. It is part of the Little Rock–North Little Rock–Conway Metropolitan Statistical Area. The city of Benton, first settled in 1833 and named after Missouri Senator Thomas Hart Benton, was formally chartered in 1836 when Arkansas became a state.

Geography

Climate
The climate in this area is characterized by hot, humid summers and generally mild to cool winters. According to the Köppen Climate Classification system, Benton has a humid subtropical climate, abbreviated "Cfa" on climate maps.

Demographics

2020 census
As of the 2020 United States census, there were 35,014 people, 13,082 households, and 8,913 families residing in the city.

2000 census
At the 2000 census there were 21,906 people in 8,713 households, including 6,186 families, in the city. The racial makeup of the city was 92.81% White, 4.46% Black or African American, 0.39% Native American, 0.56% Asian, 0.05% Pacific Islander, 0.75% from other races, and 1.19% from two or more races. 1.90% of the population were Hispanic or Latino of any race.
Of the 8,713 households 33.5% had children under the age of 18 living with them, 55.9% were married couples living together, 11.8% had a female householder with no husband present, and 29.0% were non-families. The average household size was 2.46 and the average family size was 2.95.

The age distribution was 25.3% under the age of 18, 8.8% from 18 to 24, 29.8% from 25 to 44, 21.5% from 45 to 64, and 14.7% 65 or older. The median age was 36 years. For every 100 females, there were 91.5 males. For every 100 females age 18 and over, there were 88.1 males.

The median household income was $41,503 and the median family income  was $51,064. Males had a median income of $32,493 versus $22,386 for females. The per capita income for the city was $19,797. About 5.8% of families and 8.6% of the population were below the poverty line, including 9.9% of those under age 18 and 11.5% of those age 65 or over.

Education
Public education for early childhood, elementary and secondary students is provided by:
 Benton School District, which leads to graduation from Benton High School (majority of the city)
 Bryant Public Schools, which operates Bryant High School
 Bauxite School District
A small area near Frontage Road to the southeast is physically in the Harmony Grove School District, which operates Benton Harmony Grove High School.

Notable people

Ann Clemmer – Republican former member of the Arkansas House of Representatives for District 29 and then District 23 in Saline County 
Lanny Fite – Ann Clemmer's successor in the state House District 23; former Saline County county judge 
Wes Gardner – Former relief pitcher for the New York Mets, Boston Red Sox, and others
Stuart Greer – film and television actor, is a part-time resident
Kim Hammer – Republican member of the Arkansas House of Representatives from District 28 in Saline County
Kenneth Henderson – Republican member of the Arkansas House for Pope County; former Benton resident
Cliff Lee – Major League Baseball's 2008 American League Cy Young Award winner for the Cleveland Indians and former member of the Philadelphia Phillies
Ewell Ross McCright – World War II POW
Justin Moore – country artist, born in nearby Poyen, currently resides in Benton
Joe Purcell – Arkansas governor for six days in 1979; Democratic lieutenant governor and attorney general; lawyer in Benton
Charlie Rich – Multiple Grammy Award winning country artist

References

External links

Benton, Arkansas
 Encyclopedia of Arkansas History & Culture entry: Benton (Saline County)

 
Cities in Saline County, Arkansas
County seats in Arkansas
Cities in Little Rock–North Little Rock–Conway metropolitan area
Populated places established in 1833
1833 establishments in Arkansas Territory
Cities in Arkansas